The Kingdom of Jimma was  an Oromo kingdom in the Gibe region of Ethiopia that emerged in the 18th century. It shared its western border with Limmu-Ennarea, its eastern border with the Sidamo Kingdom of Janjero, and was separated from the Kingdom of Kaffa to the south by the Gojeb River. Jimma was considered the most powerful militarily of the Gibe kingdoms.

History

Establishment 
According to legend, a number of Oromo groups (variously given from five to 10) were led to Jimma by a great sorceress and Queen named Makhore, who carried a boku (usually connected with the abba boku, or headman of the Oromo Gadaa system) which when placed on the ground would cause the earth to tremble and men to fear. It is said that with this boku, she drove the Kaffa people living in the area across the Gojeb River. While this suggests that the Oromo invaders drove the original inhabitants from the area, Herbert S. Lewis notes that Oromo society was inclusionist, and the only ethnic differences they made are reflected in the history of various kinship groups.

Eventually, the Oromo grew unhappy with Makhore's rule, and through a ruse, deprived her of her virginity, and destroyed her power. The various groups then pursued their own courses, loosely bound into a confederation that held councils at Hulle, where laws were passed under the abba boku; at this point, Jimma was commonly referred to as Jimma Kaka.

At first, the Badi of Saqqa were the predominant clan (which led to the alternate name of Jimma Badi), but late in the 18th century another group, the Diggo of Mana, began to extend their domain, conquering the Lalo clan who lived around Jiren, and gaining access to the market and trade center at Hirmata (later called Jimma). Mohammed Hassen believes that the Badi lost their predominant position in part due to raids by king Abba Bagido of Limmu-Ennarea, but also due to constant infighting. It was during the reign of Abba Jifar I that the kingdom of Jimma coalesced, and after this time Jimma was frequently referred to as Jimma Abba Jifar. King Abba Jifar also converted to Islam, and began the long process of also converting his entire kingdom to that religion. Herbert S. Lewis credits Abba Jifar with having initiated "many administrative and political innovations", despite the lack of specific historical evidence. According to oral tradition, Abba Jifar claimed the right to the extensive areas of the newly conquered land as well as virgin or unused land, which he both kept for himself and used to reward his family, followers and favorites. He reportedly constructed at least five palaces in different parts of Jimma. The historian Mordechai Abir notes that between the years 1839 and 1841 of his reign, Abba Jifar fought with Abba Bagido, the King of Limmu-Ennarea, over the district of Badi-Folla. The area was important for control of the caravan route between the Kingdom of Kaffa on the one hand, and the provinces of Gojjam and Shewa on the other. While the two Kings negotiated a peace in 1841, and sealed the treaty with the marriage of Abba Jifar's daughter to Abba Bagido's son Abba Dula, the Jimma King eventually conquered Badi-Folla (1847) and secured control over this important caravan route.

Under King Abba Gomol, the ancient Kingdom of Garo was conquered and annexed into Jimma. King Gomol settled wealthy men from his kingdom in the former state. He also brought important men from Garo to live at Jiren, thus integrating the two polities.

It was shortly after his son Abba Jifar II assumed the throne that the power of the neguses of Shewa began to reach into the Gibe region for the first time in centuries. As Lewis notes, "Borrelli, Franzoj and other travellers accorded him little hope of retaining his kingdom for long." However, heeding the wise advice of his mother Gumiti, he submitted to Menelik II, and agreed to pay tribute to the negus, and counseled his neighboring kings to do the same. However, none followed his example, and King Abba Jifar instead found himself enthusiastically helping the Shewan king conquer his neighbors: Kullo in 1889, Walamo in 1894, and Kaffa in 1897. In 1928, the tribute of Jimma amounted to MTT87,000 and an additional MTT15,000 for the army.

Following the death of Abba Jifar II, Emperor Haile Selassie seized the opportunity to finally annex Jimma. As Harold Marcus observes, the kingdom's "autonomy had been undermined by the declining world economy, the deteriorating health of its ruler, the road that slowly advanced from Addis Abeba, the advent of air power, and the transcendent needs of modern, centralized power." On 5 May 1932, the official newspaper Berhanena Selam editorialized that the kingdom was in danger because her king, Abba Jifar, was old and ill and his grandson and heir no longer properly obeyed the central government and was using the kingdom's revenues to build up an army. Seven days later, on 12 May, 400 soldiers and a team of administrators descended upon Jimma and brought the kingdom to an end. During the reorganization of the provinces in 1942, the last administrative traces of the kingdom vanished into Kaffa Province.

Administration
The Kingdom of Jimma had its own administration, which was centered at the royal palace. An officer referred to as the azazi ("the orderer") served there as the head. His function at the court was essentially that of a majordomo, exclusively overseeing domestic palace affairs. The azazi maintained a number of treasuries, and dispensed funds to cover court-related expenses. The palace also housed professional soldiers, whom the azazi had the power to assign infrastructural maintenance chores to. Other officers oversaw other day-to-day activities at the palace, including artisanal labor and royal court guest  hospitality.

Like the other Gibe kingdoms, Jimma's ruler King Abba Jifar also owned many slaves. They served as officials in the royal palace, where they attended to the needs of the King's wives and supervised the abattoir and meal preparation, among other activities. The slaves also acted as jailers, market judges, and stewards of the King's territories. Additionally, they sometimes served as governors of a province, though this position was usually given to wealthy nagadras (chief of trade and markets).

At noon, the King, his retinue, court officials and guests dined together at the mana sank'a ("house of the table"). It consisted of a great hall with several large round wooden tables. The King and 20 to 30 other individuals sat around the main table, with the remaining tables ranked in importance according to how close they were positioned to the King. During the evening, the King typically dined alone with one of his wives, and often summoned instrumentalists or Arab merchants with a gramophone for musical accompaniment.

Economy
In Jimma, Maria Theresa Thalers and salt blocks called amoleh were used as currency until the reign of Emperor Menelik II.

Coffee (Coffea arabica) became a major cash crop in Jimma only in the reign of King Abba Jifar II. Another source of income was the extraction of oil from Civets, which was used to make perfume.

See also
Rulers of the Gibe state of Jimma
List of Sunni Muslim dynasties

Notes

Former monarchies of Africa
History of Ethiopia
States and territories established in the 19th century
1790 establishments in Africa
Oromo royal families